Tatjana Schoenmaker (born 9 July 1997) is a South African swimmer specialising in breaststroke events. She won the gold medal and set the world record in the 200-metre breaststroke and also won the silver medal in the 100-metre breaststroke at the 2020 Olympic Games. She is the world record holder in the long course 200-metre breaststroke.

Career

2018 Commonwealth Games
She competed at the 2018 Commonwealth Games, winning gold medals in women's 100 metre breaststroke and the women's 200 metre breaststroke.

2020 Summer Olympics

In June 2021, Schoenmaker qualified to represent South Africa at the 2020 Summer Olympics.

Schoenmaker entered the 2020 Summer Olympics in Tokyo, Japan as the number one seed and predicted winner of the 200-metre breaststroke. She also entered the 100-metre breaststroke as the number four seed.

In the prelims of the 100-metre breaststroke, Schoenmaker ranked first out of all heats, advanced to the semifinals, and set a new Olympic record and a new African record in the event with her time of 1:04.82. The Olympic record she broke was a time of 1:04.93 set at the 2016 Summer Olympics by American Lilly King. In the semifinals, Schoenmaker swam the fastest time of 1:05.07 and ranked first heading into the final. In the final, Schoenmaker won the silver medal, which was the first medal for a South African woman in swimming at an Olympic Games since 2000.

In the prelims heats of the 200-metre breaststroke on day five of competition, Schoenmaker swam a 2:19.16, setting a new Olympic record, advancing to the semifinals ranked first overall and swimming less than a tenth of a second slower than the world record of 2:19.11 set by Rikke Pedersen. In the event's semifinals, Schoenmaker swam a 2:19.33 and ranked first, heading into the final. In the final, Schoenmaker set a new world record in the 200-metre breaststroke with her time of 2:18.95 and won the gold medal. Her world record was the first individual world record set in the sport of swimming at the 2020 Olympic Games. Her gold medal was the first gold medal won by an athlete from South Africa at the 2020 Summer Olympics. Her teammate, Kaylene Corbett, also reached the finals, making it the first time since Sydney 2000 that two South African women reached the finals of the same event.

2022
At the 2022 South Africa National Swimming Championships, Schoenmaker won the silver medal in the 50-metre breaststroke, placing second less than three-tenths of a second behind Lara van Niekerk with a time of 30.87 seconds and achieving a qualifying time for the 2022 World Aquatics Championships and 2022 Commonwealth Games in the event. She won the gold medal in the 200-metre breaststroke on day three with a time of 2:24.01. In her third event, she swam a 1:06.06 to win the silver medal in the 100-metre breaststroke, which also marked the third event she qualified in for the World Championships and Commonwealth Games. In June, she was named as one of twelve women on the South Africa swim team for the 2022 Commonwealth Games.

2022 Commonwealth Games
For the preliminaries of the 50 metre breaststroke, on day one, in swimming at the 2022 Commonwealth Games, Schoenmaker swam a 30.76 and qualified for the semifinals ranking fourth. She qualified for the final the following day with a time of 30.94 seconds in the semifinals. In the final, she finished in 30.41 seconds and placed fourth. The next morning, she ranked first in the preliminaries of the 200 metre breaststroke by over three full seconds with her time of 2:21.76, qualifying for the evening final. She won the gold medal in the final, swimming 1.20 seconds slower than the Games record of 2:20.72 set by Leisel Jones of Australia in 2006 with her time of 2:21.92. It was the third gold medal for South Africa at the 2022 Commonwealth Games across all sports. On the fourth morning, she ranked second in the preliminaries of the 100 metre breaststroke with a 1:07.10 and qualified for the semifinals. She ranked second behind Lara van Niekerk again in the semifinals, finishing in a time of 1:06.43 to qualify for the final. In the final, she won the silver medal with a time of 1:06.68.

International championships (50 m)

International championships (25 m)

Awards
 2018 Swammy Award: African Female Swimmer of the Year.
 2019 Swammy Award: African Female Swimmer of the Year.
 2020 Swammy Award: African Female Swimmer of the Year.
 SwimSwam Top 100 (Women's): 2021 (#50), 2022 (#6)
 FINA, Top 10 Moments: 2020 Summer Olympics (#4 for world record and becoming the first woman to swim the 200 metre breaststroke in less than 2:19.00)
 2021 Swimming World: African Female Swimmer of the Year award
 2022 Forbes Woman Africa Sports Award.

See also
List of African records in swimming

References

External links
 

1997 births
Living people
African Games gold medalists for South Africa
African Games medalists in swimming
Commonwealth Games gold medallists for South Africa
Commonwealth Games silver medallists for South Africa
Commonwealth Games medallists in swimming
Female breaststroke swimmers
Medalists at the 2017 Summer Universiade
Medalists at the 2019 Summer Universiade
Medalists at the 2020 Summer Olympics
Olympic silver medalists in swimming
Olympic silver medalists for South Africa
South African female swimmers
Swimmers from Johannesburg
Swimmers at the 2015 African Games
Swimmers at the 2018 Commonwealth Games
Swimmers at the 2020 Summer Olympics
Swimmers at the 2022 Commonwealth Games
Universiade gold medalists for South Africa
Universiade medalists in swimming
Universiade silver medalists for South Africa
World Aquatics Championships medalists in swimming
Olympic gold medalists for South Africa
World record holders in swimming
South African people of Dutch descent
Afrikaner people
Olympic swimmers of South Africa
20th-century South African women
21st-century South African women
Medallists at the 2018 Commonwealth Games
Medallists at the 2022 Commonwealth Games